Angelos Komvolidis (born 14 March 1988) is a Germany-born, Greek footballer who last played for Pontioi Katerini F.C.

Career
Born in Stuttgart, Komvolidis previously played for Iraklis Thessaloniki F.C. in the Greek Super League.

References

External links
Profile at Onsports.gr

1988 births
Living people
German people of Greek descent
Sportspeople of Greek descent
Citizens of Greece through descent
Greek footballers
Ethnikos Piraeus F.C. players
Iraklis Thessaloniki F.C. players
AEK Athens F.C. players
Anagennisi Karditsa F.C. players
Association football forwards